Spania nigra,  is a species of 'snipe flies' belonging to the family Rhagionidae.

It is a Palearctic species with a limited distribution in Europe

Description 
Tiny black flies without a true style, but the ventral margin of the last antennal segment is produced into a pseudostyle. Vein M3 usually does not reach the wing-margin. Metapleura bare.

Biology
The larvae are thallus-miners of thallose liverworts.

References

Rhagionidae
Insects described in 1830
Diptera of Europe
Taxa named by Johann Wilhelm Meigen